The Perils of "Privilege": Why Injustice Can't Be Solved by Accusing Others of Advantage is a 2017 non-fiction book by Phoebe Maltz Bovy.

Overview
A look into the concept of "privilege" and how it affects progressive politics and that accusing others of unearned advantages does nothing to address inequality and perhaps only makes things worse.

References

External links
Author's website

2017 non-fiction books
English-language books
Political books
Linguistic controversies
White privilege
Progressivism in the United States
St. Martin's Press books